The BTC-T Vauxhall Astra Sport Hatch is a BTC-Touring class racing car that was built for the 2005 British Touring Car Championship season by Triple 8 Race Engineering, who ran Vauxhall's official works program.

Works history

After campaigning the BTC-T Vauxhall Astra Coupe for 4 years, VX Racing took the decision to replace the car with the brand-new Astra SportHatch for the 2005 BTCC season. An experimental BTC-T spec Vectra had been built in 2003, but the experiment was not continued due to the weight of the car. Replacing such a successful car proved difficult, however; and the car only won ten out of the sixty races it contested as a works entry, in the hands of Yvan Muller, Colin Turkington and Fabrizio Giovanardi. The emergence of the BTC-T Honda Integra Type R proved to be a challenge too far for Vauxhall, despite a successful debut victory, and Vauxhall's 100th BTCC win at Knockhill in 2006. Despite the dominance of Matt Neal's Integra, however, the car did deliver the 2005 Manufacturer's championship to Vauxhall, as Team Dynamics were not competing in this championship.

Later career
After the car's replacement with the Super 2000-spec Vectra, the Turkish driver Erkut Kizilirmak bought three of the four chassis, and used them for his Arkas Racing team in the BTCC for 2007, with some occasional races in the Turkish Touring Car Championship. In 2008, Erkut expanded the BTCC effort to a two-car team, being joined by Martyn Bell.

Chassis history

Chassis CH12
2005 – Yvan Muller (Rounds 1-3)/Two Seater
2006 – Two Seater/Erkut Kizilirmak (Rounds 13-15/18-21)
2007 onwards – Two Seater

Chassis CH14
2005 – Colin Turkington (Rounds 1-12)
2006 onwards – Unused

Chassis CH15
2005/06 – Gavin Smith
2007 – Erkut Kizilirmak (Turkish Touring Car Championship)
2008 – Erkut Kizilirmak (Rounds 10-30)

Chassis CH16
2005 – Yvan Muller (Rounds 4–30)
2006 – Fabrizio Giovanardi
2007/08 – Erkut Kizilirmak (Rounds 1–9, written off at Donington Park)

Chassis CH17
2005 – Colin Turkington (Rounds 13–30)
2006/07 – Tom Chilton
2008 – Martyn Bell

References

British Touring Car Championship
Touring cars
Cars introduced in 2005
Front-wheel-drive vehicles
Astra Sport Hatch BTC-T